Celtic religion may refer to:

Ancient Celtic religion
Druidism
Celtic Christianity
Celtic Orthodox Church
Celtic Rite
Celtic Neopaganism
Celtic Reconstructionist Paganism
Celtic Wicca
Neodruidism